Charlie Barnett (born February 4, 1988) is an American actor who starred as Peter Mills, a firefighter/paramedic on the NBC drama Chicago Fire from 2012 to 2015. Among his many starring roles are Alan Zaveri on the Netflix comedy series Russian Doll, Ben Marshall on the Netflix series Tales of the City, and Gabe Miranda in the Netflix thriller series You.

Early life and education
Barnett and his sister were adopted by Bob and Danee Barnett. His adoptive mother is from Utah and is of Swedish descent, while his adoptive father is a boat builder from Minnesota. He was raised on a sailboat near Longboat Key in Florida until he was seven. He discovered theatre when he was six years old and performed in many operas and musicals with the Sarasota Youth Opera. Barnett is a graduate from Booker High School. He participated in the Carnegie Mellon Musical Theater Summer Program. After high school, Barnett attended the Juilliard School, where he graduated from the drama program class of 2010.

Career
For three seasons, from 2012 to 2015, Barnett starred as Peter Mills in the NBC action-drama television series Chicago Fire. 

In 2017, Barnett was cast in the role of Ian Porter on The CW series Valor.

In 2018, Barnett was cast in the leading role of Alan Zaveri on the Netflix series Russian Doll. In the same year, Barnett was cast in the main role of Ben Marshall on the Netflix miniseries, Tales of the City.

In 2019, Barnett was cast in the recurring role of Gabe Miranda on the second season of the Netflix thriller You. In July 2019, Barnett joined Arrow for its eighth and final season, portraying John Diggle, Jr. His role was announced at a Comic-Con panel.

Personal life
Barnett realized he was gay at the age of 13. Barnett has struggled with alcohol addiction. He resides in Los Angeles. Barnett is a graduate of the Juilliard School drama program, class of 2010. He enjoys sailing, playing Ms. Pac-Man, and classic cars. While pursuing his career, Barnett has lived in New York City, Los Angeles, Salt Lake City and Chicago. During filming for Chicago Fire, Barnett lived with co-stars Joe Minoso and Yuri Sardarov. He is a White Sox and Chicago Bears fan.

In April 2022, he announced that he was engaged to set designer Drew Bender.

Awards
 Out Magazine's'' Out100 Entertainers of the Year list for 2019

Filmography

Films

Television

References

External links
 
 Official Twitter

1988 births
Living people
Actors from Sarasota, Florida
21st-century American male actors
American male television actors
Place of birth missing (living people)
Male actors from Florida
Juilliard School alumni
American gay actors
21st-century American LGBT people
LGBT people from Florida
African-American male actors
LGBT African Americans